Pelathousa is a village in the Paphos District of Cyprus, located 5 km east of Polis Chrysochous.

References

Communities in Paphos District